Scythris acarioides is a moth of the family Scythrididae. It was described by Bengt Å. Bengtsson in 1997. It is found in Italy.

Etymology
The species name refers to the "sclerotized formation of sternum 7, reminiscent of a tick (belonging to the order Acari)".

References

acarioides
Moths described in 1997